Mount Mitten is a 3,058 foot (932 meter) peak in the Dartmouth Range in New Hampshire. It is named for a mitten that Timothy Nash lost when climbing a tree atop the mountain to get his bearings. He saw Crawford Notch.

References

Further reading
 Mount Mitten, New Hampshire on Peakbagger.com

Mountains of Coös County, New Hampshire
Mountains of New Hampshire